Life Triumphs (Romanian: Viața învinge) is a 1951 Romanian drama film directed by Dinu Negreanu. It was made at the Barrandov Studios in Prague, due to the shortage of facilities in Romania. A professor thwarts an attempt by foreign powers, using a member of the traditional pre-communist intelligentsia, to get hold of a new industrial process.

Cast
   Jules Cazaban 
 Fory Etterle  
 Ion Lucian  
 Grigore Vasiliu-Birlic  
 George Vraca

References

Bibliography 
 Liehm, Mira & Liehm, Antonín J. The Most Important Art: Eastern European Film After 1945. University of California Press, 1977.

External links 
 

1951 films
1951 drama films
Romanian drama films
1950s Romanian-language films
Films directed by Dinu Negreanu
Films shot at Barrandov Studios
Romanian political films
Romanian black-and-white films